The Blue Line or ORR-Airport Metro Line is part of the Namma Metro rail network for the city of Bangalore, Karnataka, India. It consists of two sections - Phase-2A (Silkboard to KR Puram) and Phase-2B (KR Puram to Airport). Construction of Phase-2A began in August-2021. Construction of Phase-2B is expected to begin in February-2022. The 58.19 km line connects Central Silk Board with the Kempegowda International Airport. The Line is mostly elevated but also has an at-grade (surface) section close to the Airport and 2 short underground sections where it passes the Jakkur Aerodrome and Yelahanka AFB. There are 30 stations on the line of which the two station/s at the Airport may be at surface level or underground. Blue Line will have interchanges with the Yellow Line at Central Silk Board, Purple Line at KR Pura, Pink Line at Nagawara and with the future /proposed Orange Line at Hebbal.

In June 2022, BMRCL launched the first ever U Girder span on ORR-Airport metro line. The extension of the Purple Line and construction of the Pink and Yellow Lines is currently in progress. Pink, Yellow and the Blue Line will be CBTC signaling enabled, unlike Namma Metro's first two lines (Purple and Green Lines use distance-signaling).

History 
The routes under Phase-2A and Phase-2B (Blue Line) were actually part of Phase-3 but 'fast-tracked' and prioritized under Phase-2. As early as in February 2012, the Central government had also requested BMRC to start work on the airport link during Phase 2 itself.

The route from Central Silkboard to K R Puram along the eastern part of Outer Ring Road (ORR) was included as Phase-2A since development on that part of ORR had leap-frogged much ahead of the rest of the city with huge number of new office buildings. As a result, traffic increased several fold with employees traveling from different parts of the city to this new CBD. Chief Minister of Karnataka, Siddaramaiah announced in September 2016 that a new 18 km (11 mi) line connecting Central Silk Board with K.R.Puram along ORR would be included in Phase 2 as Phase-2A of the project at an estimated cost of ₹4202 crores.

Kempegowda International Airport (opened during May 2008) being very far from city center (about 35 km), commuting time by road in traffic congestion is time-consuming. Hence, attention for building a fast mass transit was in the minds of planners from the very beginning, especially since air traffic had kept increasing. The old airport in Bengaluru, the HAL Airport, located well within the city, had closed for commercial operations as part of the terms of the PPP for the new airport.

To connect airport to city, there had initially been a proposal to build a 33 km (21 mi) high speed rail line from MG Road to Kempegowda International Airport (KIA). Cost was estimated at ₹5,767 crore (US$810 million). This was to be executed by an independent SPV - Bangalore Airport Rail Link Limited (BARLL). However, the plan for an exclusive city-airport high speed rail was canceled during October 2013 due to high cost and viability concerns.

It was decided that BMRC would manage the airport rail project and a regular metro line with fewer halts would be built instead of a high speed rail. Following this, suggestions were invited from public during September 2016 to choose any one of nine possible extension routes from existing and proposed metro lines to the airport. The proposed extension routes had an average length of 30 km (19 mi), and cost estimates ranged between ₹4,500 crore and ₹7,000 crore. A 25.9 km (16.1 mi) extension from Nagawara via Kannur and Bagaluru was the shortest, while the 35.4 km (22.0 mi) extension from Yeshwanthpur via Yelahanka, Kannur and Bagaluru was the longest of the proposed routes. BMRC received 1,300 responses from the public. The shortest (25.9 km, 16.1 mi) extension of the Kalena Agrahara (previously Gottigere) – Nagawara line via Kannur and Bagaluru to the airport emerged as the most popular choice. In February 2017, the Centre requested BMRC to start work on the airport link before Phase 3. Thus, the Airport Line was included in Phase 2 as Phase 2B.

Since the airport's managing company, Bengaluru International Airport Limited (BIAL) forbade underground construction from the southern side of the airport (due to security concerns as it would have to pass beneath the airport's second runway), the shortest route options (i.e. extending the Pink line from Nagawara directly north) were eliminated. An alternate route proceeding north till RK Hegde Nagar and then turning west to Jakkur and then along Airport Road was explored. Bangalore Development Minister K. J. George announced on 12 May 2017 that the government had finalized the Nagawara—Ramakrishna Hegde Nagar—Jakkur—Yelahanka route to the airport. However, this route had an obstacle as a high-pressure petroleum pipeline was passing through the originally proposed route.

This was changed and on 10 January 2019, the State Cabinet approved a change in alignment for the proposed metro line to the airport. The new line would begin at Krishnarajapura (K.R. Puram) and be aligned along the northern part of ORR (Outer Ring road), passing Kasturinagar, Nagawara, Hebbal, and Jakkur before heading towards the airport. The line would be 38 km long, about 9 km longer than the route previously proposed, estimated to cost ₹10,584 crore (US$1.5 billion).

Tendering

Phase-2A 
BMRCL prepared the detailed project report for the proposed Central Silk Board - KR Puram Line and submitted the DPR to the state government on 28 October 2016. Phase 2A was approved by the State Cabinet on 1 March 2017.

Tenders for the ORR (East) Metro line were called in February 2018 and IL&FS emerged the lowest bidder for all packages. However, the tenders were quashed due to cash flow problems and bankruptcy proceedings by the selected firm, IL&FS. A second round of tendering was done in December 2019. The project cost was revised to ₹5994 crores. Fresh bids were received by multiple firms in March 2020. There are two packages. The first package included 2.84 km of ramps for a flyover at Central Silk board junction in addition to 9.859 km of viaduct with six elevated stations. The second package was for 8.377 km viaduct with seven elevated stations, 1.097 km depot line and a 0.30 km pocket track.

Central government's approval was much delayed and finally received in April-2021. Tenders were awarded in May-2021 and construction on Phase-2A finally began in August-2021. Opening of this phase as per August 2022 from MD of BMRCL is expected around December 2024.

Phase-2B 
DPR for the Airport Line had been prepared in September 2017 and cleared by Government of Karnataka in January 2019.

Tenders for the Airport line were called in July 2020. There are three packages. The first package was for 11.003 km viaduct, including 281 mtrs viaduct beyond Phase-2A with eight elevated stations and 650 mtrs link line to Baiyyappanahalli depot. The second package was for 11.678 km viaduct with 250 mtrs pocket track and two elevated stations. The third package was for 15.011 km viaduct, including 718.18 mtrs cut and cover portion in front of Yelahanka Air Force Station. All three packages include road widening, utility diversion and allied works.

Bettadahalasuru station would be built by Embassy group at a cost of ₹140 crore. Kempegowda International Airport is likely to fund the construction of two airport stations off the highway. An MoU was signed between BMRC and KIAL for construction of the 4.95 km line and stations entailing an investment of ₹800 crore.

Central government's approval was delayed and finally received in April 2021. Nagarjuna Construction Company (NCC) emerged as the lowest bidder to construct the line on September 16, 2021. Construction finally began in February 2022. Opening of this phase as per August 2022 from MD of BMRCL is expected around December 2025.

In January 2023, there was an accident when an reinforcement cage of the under-construction metro pier fell on a woman software engineer, Tejaswini Sulakhe and her son Vihan in HBR Layout, which led to their eventual death. BMRCL announced a financial assistance of  20 lakh. Chief Minister Basavaraj Bommai also announced a separate compensation of Rs 10 lakh for each of the deaths from the Chief Ministers’ Relief Fund.

Funding 
The Union and State governments will contribute ₹3,973 crore by way of equity and subordinate debt. Land acquisition costs, estimated at ₹2,762 crore, will be funded by the Government of Karnataka. BMRCL will raise the remaining amount of ₹5,960 crores through loans. In March-2021, it had entered into a loan agreement with JICA for US$318 million (₹2,317 crore). BMRC has raised US$500 million (₹3643 crore) from ADB to fund construction of the Blue Line (Phase-2A and 2B).

Thus, financial arrangements have been completed for Phases 2A and 2B. The 58.19-km line is estimated to cost ₹14,788 crores.

Stations 
The Blue Line will have 30 stations.

See also 

 Namma Metro
 List of Namma Metro Stations
 Rapid transit in India
 Delhi Airport Metro Express
 Hyderabad Airport Metro Express

References

Namma Metro lines
Proposed railway lines in India